Discidae is a taxonomic family of small air-breathing land snails, terrestrial gastropod mollusks in the superfamily Punctoidea.

Genera
The family Discidae has no subfamilies. Genera within the family Discidae include:
 Anguispira Morse, 1864
  † Calogoniodiscus Pfeffer, 1930
 Canaridiscus Alonso & Ibáñez, 2011
 † Coxiola Pfeffer, 1930 
 Discus Fitzinger, 1833
 † Manganellia Harzhauser, Neubauer & Georgopoulou in Harzhauser et al., 2014 
 † Protodiscus Solem & Yochelson, 1979 
Synonyms
 Zonodiscus Pilsbry, 1948   - or as a subgenus of Anguispira: synonym of Anguispira (Zonodiscus) Pilsbry, 1948, represented as Anguispira Morse, 1864

References

External links